Waste Management, Inc., doing business as WM, is a waste management, comprehensive waste, and environmental services company operating in North America. Founded in 1968, the company is headquartered in the Bank of America Tower in Houston, Texas.

The company's network includes 346 transfer stations, 293 active landfill disposal sites, 146 recycling plants, 111 beneficial-use landfill gas projects and six independent power production plants. Waste Management offers environmental services to nearly 21 million residential, industrial, municipal and commercial customers in the United States, Canada, and Puerto Rico. With 26,000 collection and transfer vehicles, the company has the largest trucking fleet in the waste industry. Together with its competitor Republic Services, Inc, the two handle more than half of all garbage collection in the United States.

History
In 1893, Harm Huizenga, a Dutch immigrant, began hauling garbage at $1.25/wagon in Chicago. In 1968, Harm's grandson Wayne Huizenga, Dean Buntrock, and Larry Beck founded Waste Management, Inc. and began aggressively purchasing many of the smaller garbage collection services across the country. In 1971, Waste Management went public, and by 1972, the company had made 133 acquisitions with $82 million in revenue. It had 60,000 commercial and industrial accounts and 600,000 residential customers in 19 states and the provinces of Ontario and Quebec. In the 1980s, Waste Management acquired Service Corporation of America (SCA) to become the largest waste hauler in the country.

Between the years of 1976 and 1997, the executive officers of Waste Management, Inc. began "cooking" the accounting books by refusing to record expenses necessary to write off the costs of unsuccessful and abandoned landfill development projects; establishing inflated environmental reserves (liabilities) in connection with acquisitions so that the excess reserves could be used to avoid recording unrelated operating expenses, improperly capitalizing a variety of expenses; failing to establish sufficient reserves (liabilities) to pay for income taxes and other expenses; avoiding depreciation expenses on their garbage trucks by both assigning unsupported and inflating salvage values and extending their useful lives; assigned arbitrary salvage values to other assets that previously had no salvage value; failed to record expenses for decreases in the value of landfills as they were filled with waste, used netting to eliminate approximately $490 million in current period operating expenses and accumulated prior period accounting misstatements by offsetting them against unrelated one-time gains on the sale or exchange of assets; and used geography entries to move tens of millions of dollars between various line items on the company's income statement. Officers were accused of making "the financials look the way we want to show them." The top officers settled with the federal government for $30.8 million in 2005, without admitting guilt.

When a new CEO took charge of the company in 1997, he ordered a review of the company's accounting practices in 1997. In 1998 Waste Management restated its 1992-1997 earnings by $1.7 billion, making it the largest restatement in history.

In 1998 Waste Management merged with USA Waste Services, Inc. USA Waste Services CEO John E. Drury retained the chairmanship and CEO position of the combined company. Waste Management then relocated its headquarters from Chicago to Houston. The merged company retained the Waste Management brand. In late 1999, John Drury stepped down as chairman due to brain surgery. Rodney R. Proto then took the position of chairman and CEO. That year also brought trouble for the newly expanded company in the form of an accounting scandal.

In November 1999, turn-around CE was brought in to help Waste Management recover. The company has since implemented new technologies, safety standards, and operational practices.

On July 14, 2008, Waste Management offered a $34 per share all-cash bid to acquire arch-competitor Republic Services, Inc. On August 11, 2008, the bid was raised to $37 per share. On August 15, 2008, Republic Services, Inc. denied Waste Management's bid for a second time. On October 13, 2008, Waste Management withdrew its bid for Republic Services, citing financial market turmoil.

In January 2009, a global economic crisis forced Waste Management to aggressively reduce and restructure its corporate workforce.

On February 7, 2010, CBS debuted a new TV series called Undercover Boss after the Super Bowl. Waste Management COO Lawrence O'Donnell III participated in this first episode and got a chance to see up close the inner workings of the company he helped run. O'Donnell left Waste Management on July 1, 2010.

In 2015, Winters Brothers assumed all of WM's operations in Connecticut and New York (excluding New York City, and continues to service these regions under contract with WM.

Waste Management sponsored the #14 car of Sterling Marlin from 2006 until 2007 in the NASCAR Sprint Cup Series.

Rebranding to WM 
In February 2022, Waste Management announced the company would be rebranding to be referred to simply as WM. This came with an increased emphasis on sustainability and environmental services, and not just waste collection and disposal.

Recycling
Waste Management currently manages the recycling of more than 8.5 million tons of materials, including metal, plastic, glass, electronics and paper at 128 facilities.

One service provided by Waste Management, single-stream recycling, allows recyclable materials to be comingled, rather than separated by the customer and handled separately by the collection provider. The company currently operates 30 single-stream recycling facilities throughout North America. Because the single-stream recycling process eliminates the need for customers to separate items before they are collected, it usually leads to higher recycling participation rates in local communities.

Electronics recycling, or ecycling, is another focus for Waste Management. This refers to the proper disposal of electronic items like televisions, computers, microwave ovens, cellular phones, VCRs and DVDs and other such products. The U.S. Environmental Protection Agency (EPA) encourages consumers to reuse and recycle these products to keep them out of the waste stream. With this in mind, Waste Management has partnered with several companies, like LG Electronics, to recycle electronics for reprocessing.

The company operates approximately 150 e-cycling centers throughout the country through its subsidiary, WM Recycle America. In January 2010, the company announced that WM Recycle America was implementing the Responsible Recycling (R2) Program for electronics recyclers, which established accepted practices to help protect the environment and workers' health and safety while e-waste is handled. In addition, these practices allow third parties to monitor activity and create greater transparency in the e-cycling sector.

Waste Management has also invested in new methods and technologies for reusing and recycling non-traditional materials, such as organic waste and construction debris. In 2010, Waste Management announced two strategic investments to advance recycling technologies in North America:

	In January 2010, Waste Management announced it would fund Boston-area company Harvest Power, which specializes in turning food and yard waste into compost. Harvest Power is also working to develop anaerobic digester technology that uses waste to create a biogas, which can produce electricity, heat or be converted to natural gas.
	In May 2010, Waste Management announced its investment in MicroGREEN Polymers Inc., which specializes in reducing the amount plastic required for production of consumer products, like plastic bottles.

In June 2009, Waste Management signed an agreement with BigBelly Solar to be the sole waste company distributor of BigBelly's technology in North America. BigBelly compactors are self-powered by built-in solar panels and are capable of holding 180 gallons of waste. The compactors decrease the need for trash pickup by 80 percent, which reduces production costs, fuel use, and greenhouse gas emissions.

Waste Management Solar Compactors became a staple at the WM Phoenix Open; the company replaced FBR as the title sponsor of this PGA TOUR tournament in December 2009. As title sponsor, Waste Management introduced a variety of technologies to make the Phoenix Open one of the most eco-friendly tournaments on the PGA TOUR. Waste Management has been working with other sports and music venues across the nation to increase recycling among patrons. It teamed up with Live Nation to forward the Recycling Rocks! campaign across the U.S.

Additionally, its subsidiaries GreenOps, LLC and Greenopolis placed recycling kiosks in front of grocery stores and collected more than 4,000,000 bottles and cans. Waste Management then partnered with PepsiCo to use that technology to develop the Dream Machine recycling initiative to increase beverage container recycling throughout the U.S. Dream Machine kiosks are computerized recycling receptacles that include a personal reward system that allows users to accumulate and redeem points for every item they recycle at www.greenopolis.com.

Waste Management is also involved in landfill gas utilization, including landfill-gas-to-energy (LFGTE) production. The company has over 115 LFGTE facilities, and plans to add another 60 facilities by 2012. LFGTE facilities collect methane and carbon dioxide gases emitted during the natural anaerobic decomposition of organic waste in the landfill. These gases are then used to fuel engines or turbines that generate electricity to power surrounding areas.

In August 2009, Waste Management announced that it would join Valero Energy Corporation as a strategic investor in Terrabon L.L.C.'s waste-to-fuel conversion technology. Waste Management will also assist Terrabon in securing organic waste streams. Terrabon specializes in refining municipal solid wastes and sewage sludge into non-hazardous organic salts. The organic salts are then sent to Valero where it can be converted into gasoline, diesel or jet fuel.

Around this same time, Waste Management launched a joint venture with Oregon-based company InEnTec to form S4 Energy Solutions. S4 uses a process called plasma gasification (also known as plasma arc waste disposal) to heat waste materials until they break down to produce a synthesis gas, or syngas. The syngas can be converted into transportation fuels, such as ethanol or diesel, or can be used as a substitute for natural-gas heating and electricity.

In February 2010, Waste Management announced a strategic investment agreement with Enerkem Inc., a Canadian-based company that specializes in converting waste materials that are most often landfilled, such as carbon-based feedstock, municipal solid waste, construction and demolition wood and agricultural and forest residues, into biofuels like ethanol. The investment signifies Waste Management's continued efforts to invest in upcoming green technologies and to double its renewable energy production.

International

In 2009, Waste Management purchased a 40-percent stake in Shanghai Environment Group Co Ltd, a wholly-owned subsidiary of Shanghai Chengtou Holding Co Ltd. SEG sought Waste Management's investment in order to benefit from Waste Management's experience in the waste disposal field, as well as improve their technology for waste disposal.

Corporate issues

1995 lawsuit 
Shareholders sued Wheelabrator Technologies's (WTI) board of directors for breach of their fiduciary duty, challenging the merger of WTI into Waste Management. In 1995, the case, In re Wheelabrator Technologies, Inc. Shareholders Litigation, came before the Court of Chancery of Delaware on an appeal regarding the Board's motion for summary judgment. The shareholders argued the Board breached their duty of care because there was not sufficient process, they didn't look at alternative transactions, didn't consider information regarding waste's legal liabilities, they didn't appoint a committee of independent directors to negotiate the merger, and they didn't adequately consider the terms of the merger; they breached their duty of loyalty, and; they breached their duty to disclose relevant information regarding the merger. Ultimately, the court dismissed the duty of disclosure claim but allowed the duty of loyalty claim to a degree. In regards to the duty of loyalty claim, the court disagreed with both the shareholders and the Board. It labelled the merger as an interested transaction, not a controlled shareholder transaction, so the business judgment rule applies and the burden to prove waste is on the shareholders.

Accounting improprieties
Revelations of irregular accounting led to a major drop in stock price and to the replacement of top executives after a new CEO ordered a review of the company's accounting practices in 1998. Waste Management's shareholders lost more than $6 billion in the market value of their investments when the stock price plummeted by more than 33%. The company had augmented the depreciation time length for their property, plant, and equipment, artificially inflating the company's after-tax profits by US$1.7 billion. On July 8, 1999, a class action lawsuit was filed against WMI and certain officers for issuing false statements. Waste Management paid US$457 million to settle a shareholder class-action suit in 2003. The SEC fined Waste Management's independent auditor, Arthur Andersen, US$7 million for its role.

ERP software implementation failure
In 2005, Waste Management entered into a Software Licensing Agreement (SLA) with SAP AG. Under the agreement, SAP and its wholly owned subsidiary, Tomorrow Now, were to implement SAP's Enterprise Resource Planning software. The implementation began when an eight month pilot program was established in Waste Management's New Mexico market area, the market-share area at the time. This initial implementation was to be followed in two months with a company-wide implementation from Waste Management's headquarters in Houston, Texas.

In December 2007, Waste Management ended their ERP implementation effort. Waste Management characterized the ERP implementation as non-functional. An SAP sponsored "Solution Review" determined that a customized ERP, based upon an updated SAP ERP, would need to be made in order to accommodate a company-wide implementation.

Waste Management sued SAP for the US$100 million to recover the funds it had spent on the failed ERP implementation. In the lawsuit, Waste Management accused SAP of fraud and deception. SAP countered that Waste Management failed to present knowledgeable workers and accurate business models and failed to migrate data from legacy systems. The suit concluded in 2010 under confidential terms and a one time payment from SAP to Waste Management disclosed to the SEC.

Labor relations
In 2007, Waste Management locked out Teamsters at its largest hauling operation in Alameda County, CA. The lockout lasted a little less than a month and put 900 members of the Teamsters, ILWU, and Machinists Union on picket lines and raised concerns over sanitary impact on the affected communities. The lockout was stopped when affected communities started legal actions against Waste Management. According to Waste Management officials, the company worked over three months to negotiate an agreement fair to both Waste Management and the union. The union did not want to negotiate over the company's proposals and refused to offer their own proposal unless Waste Management agreed to withdraw all proposals from the table. Oakland's City Council reached a settlement with Waste Management over the dispute in March, 2008. The company rebated more than $3 million to customers and Oakland customers received additional services over the next five years.

Environmental policy and record
In 1990, the board of Waste Management adopted an environmental policy, including a policy of no-net-loss of biodiversity on the company’s properties.  Waste Management also took positions around that time supporting legislation on hazardous waste reduction (1988), waste export control (1989),  and protection of endangered species (1992). 

Waste Management's operations consist of environmental protection, groundwater protection, environmental engineering, and air and gas management. Waste Management currently operates ten full-scale waste treatment landfill projects in the U.S. and Canada. As a member of the Chicago Climate Exchange (CCX), Waste Management made a commitment during the pilot phase to reduce its greenhouse gas emissions by four percent below the average of its 1998–2001 baseline by 2006. They have also replaced nearly 500 diesel-fueled trucks with vehicles that run on 100 percent natural gas. These new garbage and recycling trucks comprise one of the nation's largest fleets of heavy-duty trucks powered exclusively by natural gas.

In November 2009, at Waste Management's Altamont Landfill, a new plant began producing 13,000 gallons a day of LNG fuel from methane gas from the landfill that had fueled an electric power plant since 1969. Waste Management has said that the plant, announced in April 2008, and built and operated by The Linde Group with state funding, is the world's largest facility to convert landfill gas into vehicle fuel.

Waste Management works with environmental groups in the U.S. to set aside land to create and manage wetlands and wildlife habitats.

In May 2011, Waste Management's Wheelabrator division agreed to pay a record $7.5 million settlement with the Commonwealth of Massachusetts for a host of environmental violations at its plants in North Andover, Saugus, and Millbury, Massachusetts. The settlement was announced on May 2, 2011 by the Massachusetts Department of Environmental Protection and Attorney General Martha Coakley's office.

Marketing
In February 2022 at the WM Phoenix Open, Waste Management announced they would be rebranding to WM. They also adopted a new slogan, dropping "think green", for "for tomorrow." 

They also are featured in a Walt Disney World Epcot attraction, Innoventions.

Waste Management has also tried to soften its impact on communities through public relations, such as its 2011 renaming of Mount Trashmore in northern Broward County, Florida, from the "North Broward County Resource Recovery and Central Disposal Sanitary Landfill" to the "Monarch Hill Renewable Energy Park."

Television

In February 2010, Waste Management was the first company featured on CBS television series Undercover Boss. Chief Operating Officer Lawrence (Larry) O'Donnell, III learned of many policies he introduced but wished to change to improve the working environment of his employees. In one example, route supervisors sometimes observe garbage collecting to monitor quality, productivity and adherence to safety rules. Some garbage collectors perceived this as spying, a characterization that disturbed O'Donnell. In another example, O'Donnell chose to end the practice of deduction of pay for time clock rules violations during the lunch hour.

O'Donnell personally intervened in the career of an administrative assistant he met while filming the series. The administrative assistant had put her family's house up for sale due to lack of sufficient income despite working two jobs. O'Donnell promoted the employee to a supervisor position, which included a higher rate of pay and bonus eligibility, thus allowing her to keep the house.

Product placement
The Waste Management brand is featured in several recent films. Waste Management vehicles and equipment are featured prominently in several scenes in Transformers: Dark of the Moon. In the film, one character transforms from a robot into a Waste Management collection vehicle. A Waste Management branded roll-off box can be seen in the background of a scene in the 2009 film Paul Blart: Mall Cop and a character dressed as a Waste Management employee appears in the film, The Spy Next Door. A Mack TerraPro truck owned by Waste Management that transforms into three Junkheaps appears in Transformers: Age of Extinction.

Financial restatements
On November 14, 1997, the company reclassified or adjusted certain items in its financial statements for 1996 and the first nine months of 1997.

On August 3, 1999, the company would have to restate first-quarter results downward, partly because of changes in the value of landfills and other
assets in connection with its acquisition last year of Wheelabrator Technologies Inc.

See also 
List of waste management companies

Notes

External links
 

Companies listed on the New York Stock Exchange
Accounting scandals
Companies based in Houston
American companies established in 1971
Waste companies established in 1971
Multinational companies
Waste management companies of Canada
Waste management companies of the United States
Articles containing video clips